The Westminster Tournament Challenge was the invitation to the 1511 Westminster Tournament, the joust held in honour of the birth a son Prince Henry to Catherine of Aragon and Henry VIII on New Year’s Day 1511. Written in the form of an allegory, The Challenge begins by introducing the four challengers who have come from the realm of Cuere Noble to ‘accomplish certain feates of Armes.’ in honour of the ‘byrthe of a yong prynce'.  Each challenger is given an allegorical name: Sir William Courtenay as Bone voloyr, Sir Edward Neville as Joyous panser, Sir Thomas Knyvet as Vailliaunt desyre, and Henry VIII as Cuere loyall. This is followed by a description of the tournament’s allegorical theme along with the rules and regulations to which the challengers and answerers will adhere. It concludes with the signatures of those who took part over the two days of the joust

The Challenge, was commissioned by Henry VIII and produced by the workshop of Thomas Wriothesley. It  is on a single piece of parchment, measuring  460 mm x 354 mm, held in the manuscript collection of the British Library. It is written in the chancery hand style; Sydney Anglo has produced a complete transcription of The Challenge's text

References 

City of Westminster
1511 in England